Dr. West's Medicine Show and Junk Band was an American psychedelic rock band. They were known best for including Norman Greenbaum, and their hit "The Eggplant That Ate Chicago", which reached No. 52 on the Billboard Hot 100 in 1966.

The band members were Norman Greenbaum (vocals), Bonnie Zee Wallach (guitar, vocals), Jack Carrington (guitar, vocals, percussion) and Evan Engber (percussion).

Discography

Albums
The Eggplant That Ate Chicago (1967)
Norman Greenbaum with Dr. West's Medicine Show and Junk Band (1969 compilation)
Euphoria: The Best of Dr. West's Medicine Show and Junk Band (1998 compilation of the album 'The Eggplant That Ate Chicago', all the singles tracks and 8 previously unreleased tracks)

Singles
 "Gondoliers, Shakespeares, Overseers, Playboys and Bums" / "Daddy I Know" (1967)
 "The Eggplant That Ate Chicago" / "You Can't Fight City Hall Blues" (1967)
 "You Can Fly" / "The Circus Left Town Today" (1967)
 "Bullets LaVerne" / "Jigsaw" (1968)

References

American psychedelic rock music groups
Jug bands